Simeon Kalfius Wolfe (February 14, 1824 – November 18, 1888) was an American lawyer and politician who served two terms as a U.S. Representative from Indiana from 1873 to 1875.

Biography 
Born near Georgetown, Indiana, Wolfe attended Floyd County schools, and was graduated from the law department of Indiana University in 1850. He was admitted to the bar in 1851 and commenced practice in Corydon, Indiana. He edited and published the Corydon Democrat from 1857 to 1865. He served as member of the Indiana State Senate from 1860 to 1864, and as delegate to the Democratic National Conventions at Charleston and Baltimore in 1860. In 1870, he moved to New Albany, where he continued the practice of law.

Congress 
Wolfe was elected as a Democrat to the Forty-third Congress (March 4, 1873 – March 3, 1875). He was not a candidate for renomination in 1874, instead resuming the practice of law, and serving as judge of the Floyd and Clark circuit court from 1880 to 1884.

Death 
He died in New Albany, Indiana, November 18, 1888, and was interred in Fairview Cemetery.

References

1824 births
1888 deaths
People from Corydon, Indiana
People from Floyd County, Indiana
Democratic Party Indiana state senators
Indiana state court judges
Indiana University Maurer School of Law alumni
Democratic Party members of the United States House of Representatives from Indiana
19th-century American politicians
19th-century American judges